Isobel is the Scottish form of the female given name Isabel. It originates from the medieval form of the name Elisabeth (Hebrew Elisheba). 

People named Isobel include:

 Isobel of Huntingdon (1199-1251), Scottish royalty
 Isobel Baillie (1895-1983), Scottish operatic soprano
 Isobel Barnett (1918-1980), British radio and television personality
 Isobel Buchanan (born 1954), Scottish operatic soprano
 Isobel Campbell (born 1976), Scottish singer, formerly with Belle and Sebastian
 Isobel Lilian Gloag (1865–1917), English painter
 Isobel Gowdie, Scottish woman who was tried for witchcraft in 1662
 Isobel Elsom (1893-1981), English actress
 Isobel Joyce (born 1983), Irish cricketer
 Isobel Loutit (1909–2009), Canadian statistician
 Isobel Miller Kuhn (1901-1957), Canadian missionary
 Isobel Lennart (1915-1971), American screenwriter and playwright
 Isobel Redmond (born 1953), Australian politician
Isobel Waller-Bridge (born 1984), British composer
 Isobel Yeung (born 1986), British journalist.
 Isobel "Izzie" Stevens, a fictional character from the American medical drama Grey's Anatomy
 Isobel Crawley, a fictional character from British period drama Downton Abbey
 Isobel Flemming, a fictional character from the American The Vampire Diaries
 Isobel (HBC vessel), operated by the HBC from 1850-1857, see Hudson's Bay Company vessels
 Isobel Kate Simpson, socialite, see socialites

Scottish feminine given names